Tillandsia portillae is a species of flowering plant in the family Bromeliaceae, endemic to Ecuador. It was first described in 1997. Its natural habitat is subtropical or tropical moist montane forests. It is threatened by habitat loss.

References

Endemic flora of Ecuador
portillae
Endangered plants
Taxonomy articles created by Polbot